Naval Force 3 is a French sailboat manufacturer based in La Rochelle. They produce a range of boats, including trimarans.

Trimaran models
Challenge 26  (Drop 26)
Challenge 30 Trimaran de croisière repliable et transportable de 30 pieds.
Challenge 33
Challenge 37
Challenge 42

Catamaran models
Twist
Piana 30
Piana 30.2
Piana 37
Tropic 40
Tropic 50
Tropic 60
Many boat charter model

Monohull models
Class 2m
S40
Boheme 30
Boheme 33

See also
 List of multihulls

References

External links
Naval Force 3 website

French boat builders